Margarett H. Campbell is a Democratic Party member of the Montana House of Representatives, representing District 31 since 2004. She most recently served as a Minority Whip.

External links
Montana House of Representatives - Margarett Campbell official MT State Legislature website
Project Vote Smart - Representative Margarett H. Campbell (MT) profile
Follow the Money - Margarett Campbell
2008 2006 2004 campaign contributions

Members of the Montana House of Representatives
1955 births
Living people
Women state legislators in Montana
University of Montana alumni
Montana State University–Northern alumni
People from Poplar, Montana
21st-century American women